Thomas Jacob (born 11 November 1965) is an East German luger who competed from the late 1980s to 1990. He won the gold medal in the mixed team event at the 1990 FIL World Luge Championships in Calgary, Alberta, Canada. He also competed at the 1988 Winter Olympics

References

External links
 

1965 births
Living people
German male lugers
Olympic lugers of East Germany
Lugers at the 1988 Winter Olympics